Gabriel Heyward Mahon Jr. (November 11, 1889 – June 11, 1962) was a U.S. representative from South Carolina.

G. Heyward Mahon Jr. was born in Williamston, South Carolina, and moved with his parents to Greenville, South Carolina in 1898. His father, Gabriel Heyward Mahon Sr., was a successful merchant who served as mayor of Greenville.  The younger Mahon attended the public schools and graduated from Greenville High School in 1904.  He attended The Citadel in Charleston, South Carolina for two years as a member of the Class of 1909 before withdrawing to begin a business career.  He was employed as a clerk in his father's retail store from 1900 to 1907, and as a traveling salesman from 1907 to 1911.  In 1911, Mahon started his own retail clothing business in Greenville.

Mahon served in the National Guard before World War I.  During the war, he served in the United States Army as a captain and later major in 1st Battalion, 118th Infantry regiment, 30th Division. He was awarded the Purple Heart and the Silver Star.

After the war, he was active in the American Legion, including service as South Carolina's state commander.  He was a trustee of Greenville Woman's College from 1921 to 1936.

Mahon was elected as a Democrat to the Seventy-fourth Congress to fill the vacancy caused by the death of John J. McSwain and on the same day was elected to the Seventy-fifth Congress and served from November 3, 1936, to January 3, 1939. He was an unsuccessful candidate for renomination in 1938.

After leaving Congress, Mahon resumed former business pursuits in Greenville.  During World War II, he was executive director of South Carolina's Council of defense.

Mahon died in Greenville on June 11, 1962. He was interred in Woodlawn Memorial Park Mausoleum.

Sources

G. Heyward Mahon Jr. at The Political Graveyard

1889 births
1962 deaths
United States Army officers
Democratic Party members of the United States House of Representatives from South Carolina
The Citadel, The Military College of South Carolina alumni
20th-century American politicians
People from Williamston, South Carolina
Greenville Senior High School (Greenville, South Carolina) alumni